USS Banshee was a large steamship "blockade runner" that was captured by the Union Navy and converted to Navy use during the American Civil War.

Service history
Banshee, a 533-ton (burden) side-wheel steamship, was built in Liverpool, England, in 1862 for employment running the Federal blockade of the Confederate coast. Her transatlantic maiden voyage, in April 1863, was a "first" for a steel-hulled ship, though her innovative construction proved troublesome in service. During the next seven months, Banshee was very successful in her intended trade, making seven round-trip voyages between Bermuda or the Bahamas and Wilmington, North Carolina. Future New York shipping magnate F.W.J. Hurst was second in command of the ship on these runs.

Sent North for adjudication by the New York Prize Court, she was purchased in March 1864 by the U.S. Navy, which converted her to a gunboat and, in June 1864, placed her in commission as USS Banshee. The steamer served for the rest of the year with the North Atlantic Blockading Squadron. In December she took part in the abortive attempt to capture Fort Fisher, North Carolina. Banshee was reassigned to the Potomac Flotilla in mid-January 1865 and spent the rest of the Civil War operating on the Chesapeake Bay and its tributaries. Decommissioned after the fighting ended, Banshee was sold in November 1865. Her new owners placed her in commercial service under the name T.L. Smallwood (or J.L. Smallwood). Sold to British interests in 1867, she was renamed Irene and remained in use at least until the 1890s.

References

External links 
 USS Banshee

Ships of the Union Navy
American Civil War patrol vessels of the United States
Steamships of the United States Navy
Gunboats of the United States Navy
Ships built on the River Mersey
1862 ships